Christopher Theofanidis (born December 18, 1967, in Dallas, Texas) is an American composer whose works have been performed by leading orchestras from around the world, including the London Symphony Orchestra, the Philadelphia Orchestra, the Moscow Soloists, the National, Atlanta, Baltimore, St. Louis, Detroit, and many others. He participated in the Young American Composer-in-Residence Program with Barry Jekowsky and the California Symphony from 1994 to 1996 and, more recently, served as Composer of the Year for the Pittsburgh Symphony during their 2006–2007 Season, for which he wrote a violin concerto for Sarah Chang.

Career
Theofanidis holds degrees from  Yale University, the Eastman School of Music, and the University of Houston, and has been the recipient of the International Masterprize (hosted at the Barbican Centre in London), the Rome Prize, a Guggenheim Fellowship, six ASCAP Gould Prizes, a Fulbright Fellowship to France, a Tanglewood Fellowship, and the American Academy of Arts and Letters' Charles Ives Fellowship. In 2007 he was nominated for a Grammy for best composition for his chorus and orchestra work, The Here and Now, based on the poetry of Rumi.

Theofanidis has recently written a ballet for the American Ballet Theatre, a work for the Orpheus Chamber Orchestra as part of their "New Brandenburg" series, and he currently has two opera commissions for the San Francisco and Houston Grand Opera companies. He has a long-standing relationship with the Atlanta Symphony, and has just had his first symphony premiered and recorded with that orchestra. He has served as a delegate to the U.S.–Japan Foundation's Leadership Program and is a former faculty member of the Peabody Conservatory and the Juilliard School. He currently teaches at the Yale School of Music.

Awards
2016 A.I. du Pont Composer's Award
2007 Grammy nomination for The Here and Now
 2003 Masterprize for Rainbow Body
 1999 Rome Prize
 1996 Guggenheim Fellowship
 1996 Barlow Prize
 six ASCAP Morton Gould Prizes
 Fulbright Fellowship to France
 Tanglewood Fellowship
 Charles Ives Fellowship, by The American Academy of Arts and Letters

Selected compositions

References

External links 
 Christopher Theofanidis's Official Site
 Masterprize 2003
 Interview by Tigran Arakelyan

Johns Hopkins University faculty
Living people
1967 births
American male composers
American people of Greek descent
21st-century American composers
Classical musicians from Texas
University of Houston alumni
Musicians from Dallas
Yale School of Music faculty
Pupils of Jacob Druckman
Pupils of Samuel Adler (composer)
21st-century American male musicians
Albany Records artists